In computing, a Pool Registrar (PR) is a component of the reliable server pooling (RSerPool) framework which manages a handlespace. PRs are also denoted as ENRP server or Name Server (NS).

The responsibilities of a PR are the following:
 Register Pool Elements into a handlespace,
 Deregister Pool Elements from a handlespace,
 Monitor Pool Elements by keep-alive messages,
 Provide handle resolution (i.e. server selection) to Pool Users,
 Audit the consistency of a handlespace between multiple PRs,
 Synchronize a handlespace with another PR.

Standards Documents 
 Aggregate Server Access Protocol (ASAP)
 Endpoint Handlespace Redundancy Protocol (ENRP)
 Aggregate Server Access Protocol (ASAP) and Endpoint Handlespace Redundancy Protocol (ENRP) Parameters
 Reliable Server Pooling Policies

External links 
 Thomas Dreibholz's Reliable Server Pooling (RSerPool) Page
 IETF RSerPool Working Group

Internet protocols
Internet Standards